Second Chance is a 1947 American film noir  crime film directed by James Tinling and written by Arnold Belgard. The film stars Kent Taylor, Louise Currie, Dennis Hoey, Larry J. Blake, Ann Doran and John Eldredge. The film was released on July 18, 1947, by 20th Century Fox.

Plot

Joan Summers (Louise Currie) enters the office of jewel merchant Montclaire (Francis Pierlot) closely followed by Kendal Wolf (Kent Taylor). Each recognizes the other to be a jewel thief, and wordlessly they team together to steal a $30,000 diamond. Searched and questioned when the gem is missed, they are released....with the gem. Detective Sharpe (Larry Blake) is still suspicious and so is the head of Jeweler's Indemnity, who puts two underworld men on to retrieve the diamond. Kendal agrees to meet the two but the police are tipped and Sharpe confiscates the gem and the fence's money. Again Kendal and Joan are released, but each suspects the other of being an informer despite a growing romantic attachment. Kendal and Joan attend an exhibition of the Malabar diamonds, leave to follow a diamond-lade guest, overtake her car, shoot the chauffeur and slug the woman. At Kendal's apartment, Joan makes it clear that robbery, not murder, is her game. Two men and the robbed couple arrive and reveal the whole thing to be a hoax to test whether Joan will work with the gang and to assure them she wasn't the informer in the first theft.

Cast   
Kent Taylor as Kendal Wolf
Louise Currie as Joan Summers
Dennis Hoey as Roger Elwood
Larry J. Blake as Det. Sgt. Sharpe 
Ann Doran as Doris Greene
John Eldredge as Conrad Martyn
Paul Guilfoyle as Nick 
William Newell as Pinky
Guy Kingsford as Jerry
Charles Flynn as Sam
Eddie Fetherston as Bart
Francis Pierlot as J.L. Montclaire
Betty Compson as Mrs. Davenport
Edwin Maxwell as Mr. Davenport
Archie Twitchell as Barker

References

External links 
 

1947 films
20th Century Fox films
American crime films
1947 crime films
Films directed by James Tinling
Films produced by Sol M. Wurtzel
American black-and-white films
1940s English-language films
1940s American films